Mummy Sandbox is a 2021 video game by American independent developer Z. Bill. Described as a "first-person digging simulator meets point-and-click adventure, the game is an adventure game that requires players to obtain body parts by exhuming corpses. The developer, Z. Bill, stated the game was inspired by Minecraft and "stubborn point-and-click adventure game" mechanics. The game was praised by critics for its environmental storytelling and was included in the 2021 Haunted PS1 Demo Disc, a compilation of horror games with graphics influenced by the PlayStation curated by Breogán Hackett.

Gameplay 

The player is a formless being that seeks to become a mummy, but lacks the body parts to become one. In order to become a mummy, the player digs for body parts in sandboxes. Players uncover a range of accessories and items, which they can combine with bodies in the ground to trade for body parts, which involves a puzzle element of knowing which items to use on which bodies. The player later is able to acquire the ability to use sand acquired when digging to build sandcastles, which allow vertical travel to areas that are otherwise out of reach.

Reception 

Writing for Dread XP, Jans Holstrom praised the game as "enthralling", highlighting the game's "environmental storytelling" to enable the player to "(use) the environment to piece together what is happening (and) give you just enough to built a narrative in your head." Joel Couture of Indie Games Plus stated the game was "an eerie, yet delightful adventure game," whilst observing that the game's item system requires "a bit of trial end error."

References

External links 

2021 video games
Indie video games
Single-player video games
Windows games
Windows-only games